Jan Greshoff (15 December 1888, Nieuw-Helvoet – 19 March 1971, Cape Town) was a Dutch journalist, poet, and literary critic.  He was the 1967 recipient of the Constantijn Huygens Prize.

Partial list of works
 1909 - Aan den verlaten vijver
 1910 - Door mijn open venster...
 1918 - Latijnsche lente
 1924 - De ceder
 1924 - Mengelstoffen o.h. gebied der Fransche Letterkunde
 1925 - Dichters in het koffyhuis (onder pseudoniem van Otto P. Reys)
 1925 - Sparsa
 1925 - Geschiedenis der Nederl. letterk. (met J. de Vries)
 1926 - Aardsch en hemelsch
 1926 - Zeven gedichten
 1927 - De Wieken van den Molen
 1929 - Bij feestelijke gelegenheden
 1928 - Confetti
 1930 - Currente calamo
 1931 - Spijkers met koppen
 1932 - Janus Bifrons
 1932 - Mirliton
 1932 - Voetzoekers
 1933 - Pro domo
 1934 - Arthur van Schendel
 1936 - Critische vlugschriften
 1936 - Gedichten, 1907-1936
 1936 - Rebuten
 1938 - Ikaros bekeerd
 1938 - In alle ernst
 1939 - Steenen voor brood
 1941 - Fabrieksgeheimen
 1943 - Muze, mijn vriendin
 1944 - Catrijntje Afrika
 1944 - Het spel der spelen
 1948 - Zwanen pesten
 1948 - Gedichten
 1948 - Legkaart
 1950 - Het boek der vriendschap
 1950 - Grensgebied
 1955 - Marnix Gijsen (met R. Goris)
 1956 - Volière (Aviary)
 1956-1958 - De laatste dingen (The Last Things)
 1957 - Bric à brac (Bric à Brac)
 1958 - Menagerie (Menagerie)
 1958 - Nachtschade (Nightshade)
 1958 - Pluis en niet pluis
 1964 - Wachten op Charon (Waiting For Charon)
 1967 - Verzamelde gedichten 1907-1967 (Collected Poems 1907-1967)
 1968 - Wind wind (Wing Wind)
 1969 - Afscheid van Europa (Farewell To Europe)

Awards
 1927: Prize of Amsterdam
 1967: Constantijn Huygens Prize

References
Profile at the Digital library for Dutch literature

1888 births
1971 deaths
Constantijn Huygens Prize winners
Dutch literary critics
Dutch male poets
People from Hellevoetsluis
20th-century Dutch poets
20th-century Dutch male writers
20th-century Dutch journalists